The Trans-Karakum Railway is a  long railway in the central Asian republic of Turkmenistan. The railway was officially completed on 19 February 2006.

The railway took over 1,500 workers more than five years to build, with 800 contractors working in the harsh conditions of the Karakum Desert. The railway was built using no foreign specialists - only companies and contractors from Turkmenistan were used. The opening ceremony was held at Içoguz (formerly Darvaza), where a white marble railway station with a capacity of 100 people a day was built for the event. 

The railway takes 12 hours to traverse, halving the previous travel time between the two cities of Ashgabat and Dashoguz by replacing the route from through Mary and Lebap provinces and along the border with Uzbekistan with one  shorter. There are 17 stations along the entire route, some serving existing villages, and others serving as a drop-off point for planned villages. Over 130 bridges span the various water features, and a new highway is also being constructed alongside the railway. It is the third large-scale project implemented since Turkmenistan's independence.

External links
 Construction of Trans-Karakum railway nears completion in Turkmenistan Turkmenistan.ru
 Northern and southern stretches of Trans Karakum railway connected in Turkmenistan Turkmenistan.ru

References

Railway lines in Turkmenistan